Guillaume de Montfort (died 27 August 1101) was a French bishop, most notably the Bishop of Paris from 1095 to 1101.

Early life
Montfort was the son of Simon I de Montfort. His date of birth is not known. He became a clerk to Saint Ivo of Chartres, the Bishop of Chartres.

Election
In 1095, Pope Urban II held the Council of Clermont at Clermont-Ferrand, France. It excommunicated Philip I of France and Bertrade de Montfort, William's sister, for adultery. William had been noted as a great supporter of Urban II, and after the death of Geoffrey of Boulogne on 1 May 1095 he was in the running to become Bishop of Paris.

As the queen's brother, he held considerable power and sway over the council that elected him - he was also known for his religious devotion. However, he was young and a fairly minor member of the French church.

Urban II considered Montfort a viable choice for the bishopric, however due to his relations to the excommunicated Philip I he was not chosen. However, in July 1096 Philip's excommunication was lifted and the Pope allowed him to become bishop.

Death
He fought in the First Crusade, but was killed there in battle on 27 August 1101.

References

Year of birth unknown
Date of birth unknown
1101 deaths
Bishops of Paris
Christians of the First Crusade
11th-century French Roman Catholic bishops
House of Montfort